Andreas Pauli (born October 27, 1993) is a German professional ice hockey player. He is currently playing for Bad Nauheim of the German DEL2.

Pauli last made his Deutsche Eishockey Liga (DEL) debut playing with EHC München during the 2011-12 season.

References

External links

1993 births
Living people
EHC München players
German ice hockey forwards
People from Bad Tölz
Sportspeople from Upper Bavaria